Sabin Vaccine Institute (Sabin), located in Washington, D.C., is a nonprofit organization promoting global vaccine development, availability, and use. Through its work, Sabin hopes to reduce human suffering by preventing the spread of vaccine-preventable, communicable disease in humans through herd immunity and mitigating the poverty caused by these diseases.

Background 
Founded in 1993 in honor of Albert B. Sabin, creator of the oral polio vaccine, Sabin works to reduce "human suffering from vaccine-preventable and neglected tropical diseases (NTDs)." The organization endeavors to reach its goal via its three main programs:  Sabin Vaccine Development, the Global Network for Neglected Tropical Diseases, and Vaccine Advocacy and Education. Through its Product Development Partnership (PDP), Sabin has worked with organizations such as King Saud University, Texas Children's Hospital Center, International Vaccine Institute, and George Washington University School of Medicine & Health Sciences toward its goals, with funding and support from the Bill & Melinda Gates Foundation, the National Institute of Allergy and Infectious Diseases, the Dutch Ministry of Foreign Affairs, the Brazilian Ministry of Health and other benefactors.

Vaccine development and research
In 2012, Sabin partnered with International Vaccine Institute to combine their research, development, and promotion efforts in Asia, Africa, and the Americas.
Sabin is currently working on multiple vaccines for humans including vaccines for Hookworm infection (Na-GST-1, Na-APR-1), Schistosomiasis (Sm-TSP-2), Chagas disease (Tc24, TSA-1), Leishmaniasis (Ld-NH36, PdSP15), severe acute respiratory syndrome (SARS)/Middle East respiratory syndrome (MERS) (Pan-β-CoVax), Soil-transmitted helminthiasis (STH), and Onchocerciasis (Ov-103, Ov-RAL-2). There is no limit to the amount of funding it and its partners (such as academia) receive from the pharmaceutical industry for research and development.

Neglected tropical diseases 

In 2006, Sabin co-founded the Global Network for Neglected Tropical Diseases in order "to raise the awareness, political will and funding necessary to control and eliminate the most common NTDs." Through its work on NTDs, Sabin hopes to reduce poverty caused by these diseases as many of them have been shown to adversely affect "childhood cognitive development among the poor, thereby reinforcing poverty."

Advocacy and education 
Sabin works with experts and organizations from around the world to advance knowledge of both infectious diseases and the vaccines that can prevent them. Through the International Association of Immunization Managers (IAIM) Network, Sabin arranges international forums to improve the success rates of immunization programs. Sabin serves as the secretariat for the Coalition against Typhoid, and its mission is to raise awareness of typhoid and salmonellosis.

Two months prior to the Covid-19 pandemic, Bruce Gellin, President of the Sabin Vaccine Institute, was member to a meeting titled "Universal Flu Vaccine" (dated October 29, 2019) with other government officials including Anthony Fauci, speaking about the need to "blow up the system" in-order to bypass regulatory control on mRNA vaccines. Also discussed in the meeting, held at the Milken Institute School of Public Health, was the need to create an "aura of excitement" and "make influenza sexy" in order to receive government funding and have hyper-production of the mRNA vaccines which he and others in the meeting believed were superior to "traditional egg-based vaccines".

Board of directors 
 Axel Hoos (chairman)
 Amy Finan (ex officio trustee)
 Peter L. Thoren (vice chairman)
 Wendy Commins Holman
 Kenneth Kelley
 Paul Maddon
 Michael W. Marine
 Regina Rabinovich
 Philip K. Russell (past chairman)

Gold medal award

First awarded in 1994, the Albert B. Sabin Gold Medal is presented by Sabin each year to one or more persons who have made a major contribution to the field of vaccinology or related fields. The award is given in honor of the work of Albert B. Sabin. Past recipients of the award include Samuel L. Katz (2003), Joseph L. Melnick (1996), and Ruth S. Nussenzweig (2008).

References 

1993 establishments in Washington, D.C.
Advocacy groups in the United States
Charities based in the United States
Institutes based in the United States
Medical and health organizations based in Washington, D.C.
Non-profit organizations based in Washington, D.C.
Scientific organizations established in 1993
Vaccination-related organizations
Vaccination in the United States
Organizations established in 1993
Non-profit organizations based in the United States
1993 establishments in the United States